Andrei Ciofu (born 31 May 1994) is a Moldovan footballer who last played as a midfielder for Polish club Olimpia Grudziądz.

Club career
On 28 September 2020, he signed with Polish club Olimpia Grudziądz.

Honours
Milsami Orhei
Moldovan Cup: 2011–12
Moldovan Super Cup: 2012

References

1994 births
Living people
Moldovan footballers
Moldova youth international footballers
Moldova under-21 international footballers
FC Milsami Orhei players
FC Costuleni players
FC Academia Chișinău players
Speranța Nisporeni players
FK Atlantas players
A.E. Sparta P.A.E. players
FC Vereya players
FC Stumbras players
FK Panevėžys players
Olimpia Grudziądz players
Moldovan Super Liga players
A Lyga players
First Professional Football League (Bulgaria) players
Moldovan expatriate footballers
Moldovan expatriate sportspeople in Lithuania
Moldovan expatriate sportspeople in Greece
Moldovan expatriate sportspeople in Bulgaria
Moldovan expatriate sportspeople in Poland
Expatriate footballers in Lithuania
Expatriate footballers in Greece
Expatriate footballers in Bulgaria
Expatriate footballers in Poland
Association football midfielders